Carmichael is a Scottish surname. It is derived from Carmichael, in Lanarkshire. This place name is composed of two word elements: the British caer ("fort") and the personal name Michael. It is also used as an anglicisation of MacGillemicheil. Notable people with the surname include:

Ailsa Carmichael, Lady Carmichael, Scottish judge
Al Carmichael (1928–2019), American football player and stunt performer
Alexander Carmichael, collector and author of Carmina Gadelica
Alistair Carmichael, Scottish Liberal Democratic politician
Amy Carmichael, missionary to Tamil Nadu, India
Angus Carmichael (1925–2013), Scottish footballer
Archibald Drummond Carmichael (1859–?), industrial chemist in Broken Hill, Australia
Caitlin Carmichael, American child actress
Cartwright Carmichael, American basketball player
Chris Carmichael (cyclist), cycling trainer for Lance Armstrong and others
Chris Carmichael (musician), American violin, cello player
Colin Carmichael, Green Party of Ontario candidate for the electoral district of Cambridge
David Carmichael (railway engineer) Scottish railway engineer
David Carmichael, American pastry chef
Dillon Carmichael, American singer
Elizabeth Carmichael, English artist active between 1768 and 1820
 Emily Carmichael (novelist), American novelist
 Emily Carmichael (filmmaker), American filmmaker
Franklin Carmichael, Canadian artist
Gene Carmichael, American businessman and politician
Gershom Carmichael, Scottish philosopher
Greg Carmichael, English guitarist
Harold Carmichael, played for the American football team, the Philadelphia Eagles
Hoagy Carmichael, American singer and songwriter 
Ian Carmichael, British actor
Jackie Carmichael (born 1990), American basketball player
James Carmichael (disambiguation), several people
Jerrod Carmichael, American comedian of The Carmichael Show
Jesse Carmichael, keyboardist and backing singer of Maroon 5, a rock band from Los Angeles
Joel Carmichael, historical essayist, editor and translator
John Carmichael (disambiguation), several people
Laura Carmichael, English actress, played Lady Edith Crawley in historical drama Downton Abbey
Leonard Carmichael, American educator, associated with Tufts University
Lindsey Carmichael, American Paralympian archer
Neil Carmichael (Conservative politician), Conservative MP for Stroud
Neil Carmichael, Baron Carmichael of Kelvingrove, Glasgow Labour MP (1962-1983) 
Nelson Carmichael, American Olympic freestyle skier
Ralph Carmichael (1927–2021), American composer and arranger
Richard H. Carmichael (1913-1983), United States Army general
Ricky Carmichael, professional motocross racer
Robert Daniel Carmichael, American mathematician
Robert P. Carmichael, one of the inventors of the Precooled jet engine
Sandy Carmichael, Scottish rugby player who also played for the British Lions
Stokely Carmichael, Trinidadian/American Black activist
Thomas Gibson-Carmichael, 1st Baron Carmichael, a Scottish Liberal politician and colonial administrator
Videt Carmichael (born 1950), American politician

Fictional characters
Abbie Carmichael, ADA from the Law & Order franchise
Anthony Carmichael, profiterole chef and "Music 2000" contestant who performs the song "The Rapping Song" in Series 2, Episode 1 of Look Around You 
 Atlas Jericho "A.J." Carmichael is an Shubunkin goldfish inside a robotic body in the TV series The Umbrella Academy  
Charles Carmichael, alias of Chuck Bartowski on the TV series Chuck
Chloe Carmichael, character from The Fairly OddParents
Joseph Carmichael, character from the film The Changeling (1980 film)
Lori Carmichael, character from Mary Stanton's Unicorns of Balinor book series
Lucy Carmichael, character from the US sitcom The Lucy Show
Patricia Carmichael, DCS, Head of AC.3 in Line of Duty, played by Anna Maxwell Martin.
Ron Carmichael, character from Jim Butcher's The Dresden Files book series
Sam Carmichael, character from the film franchise Mamma mia
Susie Carmichael, character from the Nickelodeon TV series Rugrats and All Grown Up!
Zara Carmichael, character from the BBC soap opera Doctors

References 

English-language surnames
Scottish surnames